Amblyseius segregans is a species of mite in the family Phytoseiidae.

References

segregans
Articles created by Qbugbot
Animals described in 1966